Phazha Butale (born 23 April 1976) is a Botswana footballer who currently plays as a midfielder for Notwane FC. He won seven caps for the Botswana national football team between 2003 and 2004.

See also
Football in Botswana

References

External links

Association football midfielders
Botswana footballers
Botswana international footballers
1976 births
Living people
Notwane F.C. players